A number of steamships were named Auriga, including:
, an Italian passenger ship in service 1949–57
, a Hansa A Type cargo ship in service 1956–65